Jesús Andrés Delgado Corrales (born April 19, 1984) is a Venezuelan former professional baseball pitcher and current professional baseball coach in the Texas Rangers organization. He played in Major League Baseball (MLB) for the Florida Marlins. He also played for the Rojos del Aguila de Veracruz and the Leones de Yucatan of the Mexican Baseball League.

Professional career

Boston Red Sox
He was signed by Red Sox as non-drafted free agent on February 20, 2001. In his first year in  he went 0–2 with 5.34 ERA in 10 games (eight starts) in the Dominican Summer League. He also participated in Fall Instructional League. Delgado missed the  season due to elbow injury that required surgery on Ulnar Collateral Ligament, more commonly known as Tommy John surgery. He also missed the  season recovering from the injury. He spent time with the Single-A Augusta GreenJackets and the Red Sox Gulf Coast League affiliate. Delgado went 1–5 with 5.22 ERA in 21 games (16 starts) with Augusta. He had a 2.77 ERA in 13 games on road, and 10.07 ERA in eight games at home. Placed on the disabled list from July 10 to August 22, and made one rehab start with the GCL Red Sox where he allowed two earned runs in 1.2 innings. Later that season, he participated in the Fall Instructional League and he also pitched for Aragua in the Venezuelan Winter League. In  Delgado spent his entire season with the Single-A Greenville Drive, where he went 7–3 with two saves and 3.50 ERA in 33 games.

Florida Marlins
He was acquired from Red Sox with Hanley Ramírez, Aníbal Sánchez and Harvey García in exchange for Josh Beckett, Mike Lowell and Guillermo Mota on November 24, 2005.

Seattle Mariners
On March 15, Delgado was claimed off waivers by the Seattle Mariners.

Cincinnati Reds
On January 20, 2010, Delgado signed a minor league contract with the Cincinnati Reds.

Rojos del Aguila de Veracruz
On March 18, 2011, Delgado signed with the Rojos del Aguila de Veracruz of the Mexican Baseball League. He was released on July 26, 2011.

Leones de Yucatan
On March 16, 2012, Delgado signed with the Leones de Yucatan of the Mexican Baseball League. He was released on April 6, 2012.

T & A San Marino
In June 2014, Delgado signed with T & A San Marino of the Italian Baseball League.

Coaching career
Delgado joined the Texas Rangers organization as a coach in 2017, and has been as the pitching coach of the DSL Rangers (2) since 2017.

Personal life
He graduated from U.E. Torres Bina in 2002.

See also
 List of Major League Baseball players from Venezuela

References

External links

MiLB.com, or Pura Pelota – VPBL statistics

1984 births
Living people
Albuquerque Isotopes players
Augusta GreenJackets players
Carolina Mudcats players
Dominican Summer League Red Sox players
Florida Marlins players
Greenville Bombers players
Gulf Coast Red Sox players
Jupiter Hammerheads players
Leones de Yucatán players
Louisville Bats players
Major League Baseball pitchers
Major League Baseball players from Venezuela
Mexican League baseball pitchers
Minor league baseball coaches
Sportspeople from Maracay
Peoria Saguaros players
Rojos del Águila de Veracruz players
Tacoma Rainiers players
Tiburones de La Guaira players
Tigres de Aragua players
Venezuelan baseball coaches
Venezuelan expatriate baseball players in Mexico
Venezuelan expatriate baseball players in the United States
Venezuelan expatriate baseball players in San Marino
Venezuelan expatriate baseball players in the Dominican Republic